Gowri is a 1963 Indian Kannada-language film, directed by S. K. A. Chari and produced by K. Narayan Rao. The film stars Sowkar Janaki, Rajkumar and Sandhya. The film has musical score by G. K. Venkatesh. This was the first Kannada movie to adapt already written Kannada poems into movie songs. The movie was remade from the 1952 Telugu movie Daasi with few modifications in the plotline.

Cast

Sowkar Janaki
Rajkumar 
K. S. Ashwath 
Sandhya
M. N. Lakshmi Devi
Baby Suma
Baby Latha
Master Chandrashekar
Master Francis

Soundtrack
"Ivalu Yaaru Balle Yenu" (Male Version) - P. B. Sreenivas
"Yaava Janmada Maitri" - S. Janaki
"Putta Putta Hejje" - S. Janaki, P. B. Sreenivas
"Ivalu Yaaru Balle Yenu" (duet) - S. Janaki, P. B. Sreenivas
"Naa Bedavende" - S. Janaki
"Putta Putta Hejje" (female) - S. Janaki

References

External links
 

1963 films
1960s Kannada-language films
Films scored by G. K. Venkatesh